"It All Started with a Beer" is a song recorded by American country music artist Frankie Ballard. It was released in November 2015 as the first single from Ballard's third studio album, El Rio. The song was written by Jaren Johnston, Neil Mason and Jeremy Stover.

Music video
The music video was directed by Marcel and premiered in March 2016.

Charts
The song has sold 212,500 copies in the United States as of July 2016.

Weekly charts

Year end charts

References 

2015 songs
2015 singles
Frankie Ballard songs
Warner Records Nashville singles
Songs written by Jaren Johnston
Songs written by Jeremy Stover
Songs about alcohol
Song recordings produced by Marshall Altman
Music videos directed by Marcel (singer)